Tan Sri Dato’ Haji Anwar bin Haji Abdul Malik (1898–1998) was a Malaysian politician. Anwar along with, Dato' Onn Jaafar, Tan Sri Mohamed Noah Omar, Haji Syed Alwi bin Syed Sheikh al-Hadi and Dato' Syed Abdul Kadir Mohamed formed the United Malays National Organisation to counter the Malayan Union that was undermining the Malay Sultans's powers and threatened the Malays of their rights as Bumiputera.

Political career
Anwar was credited with giving the United Malays Organisation (UMO) its name. Zainal Abidin Ahmad later on added the word "National" into the name and thus becoming the United Malays National Organisation (UMNO). After the Second World War, the Malayan Union was formed by the British and it was strongly opposed by the Malays as the union threatened Malay sovereignty over Malaya.

Anwar, along with Haji Syed Alwi bin Syed Sheikh al-Hadi and Syed Abdul Kadir Mohamad, went to Batu Pahat to meet the district officer, Dato' Onn Jaafar, who was a close friend of Anwar's. Together, they created the idea of forming a single party that would be strong enough to oppose the Malayan Union. They were later on joined by Mohamed Noah Omar who became the first Speaker of the Dewan Rakyat. After the meeting, Anwar became the representative to Johor Bahru to rally the Malays together to join the proposed idea of forming one party. Onn Jaafar at that time, together with the Malays from Batu Pahat, had formed, the Johor Peninsular Malay Movement. (Pergerakkan Melayu Semenanjung Johor). The movement had drawn many from Johorean towns such as Muar, Tangkak, Pontian and Kluang. Onn Jaafar then asked his fellow companions on what name should they give the party. Anwar suggested "United Malays Organisation" (UMO). Everyone agreed. On that night, Onn wrote a letter to Utusan Melayu that published the letter, announcing the formation of UMO and proposed congress with other Malay parties to join UMO. A series of Malay congresses were held, culminating in the formation of the nationalist party, United Malays National Organisation (UMNO) on 11 May 1946 at the Third Malay Congress in Johor Bahru, with Dato' Onn Jaafar as its leader.

When Dato' Onn Jaafar became Chief Minister of Johor on 1 June 1947, Anwar became his private secretary. As Onn could not maintain two roles as Chief Minister of Johor and President of UMNO, he resigned as chief minister in May 1950. The following year, Onn felt disgusted with what he considered UMNO's race communalist policies, and called for the party to be opened to all Malayans and have UMNO change its name to United Malayans National Organisation. When his recommendations were met with hostility, he left the party on 26 August 1951 along with Anwar and formed the Independence of Malaya Party (IMP). The party failed to gain support. Onn went to form Parti Negara in February 1954. Anwar retired in 1954 and afterwards, sat on many boards — all in a voluntary capacity. He would help the poor and needy irrespective of race

Background and family
Anwar was born in Muar, Johor in 1898. His father, Haji Abdul Malik was a Syariah lawyer.  Anwar has mixed blood including, Ethiopian from his grandmother, Arab from his grandfather and Javanese blood from his mother.

Anwar married his first wife and together conceived 3 children, Shukriah Anwar, Mohamad Hifni Anwar and Marina Anwar.

When Anwar's wife died, he married Saodah Abdullah. They had 3 children, Tan Sri Datuk Zarinah Anwar (1953), the ex-chairman of the Malaysian Securities Commission, Zainah Anwar (1954), a prominent Malaysian non-governmental organisation leader and activist of Sisters in Islam and Ahmad Zakii Anwar (1955), a well-known Malaysian artist.

Anwar died in 1998 just two months before his 100th birthday in Johor Bahru. His wife, Saodah Abdullah died the following year at the age of 78. Anwar was buried at Mahmoodiah Muslim Cemetery in Johor Bahru in front of Makam Mahmoodiah.

Honours
Anwar has also been awarded medals for his services to the country.
Some of the awards include:

 
  Commander of the Order of Loyalty to the Crown of Malaysia (PSM) – Tan Sri (1996)
 
  1939-1945 Star
  Pacific Star
  Defence Medal
  War Medal 1939–1945
  Queen Elizabeth II Coronation Medal
 
  Sultan Ibrahim Diamond Jubilee Medal
  Sultan Ismail Coronation Medal
  Long Service Medal

Media
In the 2007 film, 1957: Hati Malaya, directed by Shuhaimi Baba, Anwar was portrayed by local Malaysian actor, Azhar Sulaiman.

References

1898 births
1998 deaths
People from Muar
People from Johor
Malaysian people of Malay descent
Malaysian people of Ethiopian descent
Malaysian people of Arab descent
Malaysian people of Javanese descent
Malaysian Muslims
United Malays National Organisation politicians
Commanders of the Order of Loyalty to the Crown of Malaysia